Placopecten is a genus of scallops, marine bivalve molluscs in the family Pectinidae, the scallops.

Species
Species within the genus Placopecten include:
 Placopecten magellanicus (Gmelin, 1791) — Atlantic deep-sea scallop

References

Pectinidae
Bivalve genera
Taxa named by Addison Emery Verrill